Golden Boy is a 1939 American drama romance sports film directed by Rouben Mamoulian and starring Barbara Stanwyck, Adolphe Menjou and William Holden. It is based on the 1937 play of the same title by Clifford Odets.

Plot

Young, promising violinist Joe Bonaparte (William Holden) is in financial difficulties and decides to earn money as a boxer, though he will risk hand injuries. His father, Mr. Bonaparte senior (Lee J. Cobb), wants his son to continue developing his musical talent and buys him an expensive violin for his 21st birthday. But Joe persuades the almost bankrupt manager Tom Moody (Adolph Menjou) to let him try his hand at boxing and wins match after match. When his conscience starts bothering him and he questions his decision to enter boxing, Lorna Moon (Barbara Stanwyck), Moody's girl, is dispatched to convince him to keep fighting. Gangster Eddie Fuseli (Joseph Calleia) tries to get a piece of the action and buys Moody's share, turning the formerly sweet Joe into a hard-hearted boxer. Joe enters the semi-final match against Chocolate Drop (James “Cannonball” Green) determined to win, but when he knocks out his opponent in the second round, killing him, both his and Lorna's attitudes change. He retires from boxing and returns with Lorna to his father and his music.

Cast

The cast included:
 Barbara Stanwyck as Lorna Moon
 Adolphe Menjou as Tom Moody
 William Holden as Joe Bonaparte
 Lee J. Cobb as Mr. Bonaparte
 Joseph Calleia as Eddie Fuseli
 Sam Levene as Siggie
 Edward Brophy as Roxy Lewis (credited as Edward S. Brophy)
 Beatrice Blinn as Anna
 William H. Strauss as Mr. Carp
 Don Beddoe as Borneo

James "Cannonball" Green plays Chocolate Drop, Joe's final opponent, in an uncredited role.

Production
In 1938, Columbia purchased the rights to Odets' play for $100,000, intending to produce a film starring Jean Arthur and directed by Frank Capra. Actors considered for the role of Joe Bonaparte included John Garfield, Elia Kazan, Richard Carlson, and Tyrone Power. However, director Rouben Mamoulian expressed interest in Holden after seeing his screen test, and convinced Columbia to purchase 50 percent of Holden's contract from Paramount Pictures. Golden Boy was Holden's first starring role and jumpstarted his career.

The producers were initially unhappy with Holden's work and tried to dismiss him, but Stanwyck insisted that he be retained. Thirty-nine years later, when Holden and Stanwyck were joint presenters at the 1978 Academy Awards, he interrupted their reading of a nominee list to publicly thank her for saving his career. In 1982, Stanwyck returned the favor during her acceptance speech for an Honorary Oscar at the 1982 Academy Award ceremony, saying of Holden, who had died in an accident a few months earlier: "I loved him very much, and I miss him. He always wished that I would get an Oscar. And so tonight, my golden boy, you got your wish".

Playwright Clifford Odets was reportedly displeased at the many changes made in the film from his original play, partly due to the Motion Picture Production Code and partly to the rewritten ending. Whereas the play ended with Joe and Lorna deciding to escape their problems and being killed in a car accident, the film closes with Joe and Lorna deciding to return to Joe's home together.

The climactic boxing scene was filmed on location at Madison Square Garden in New York City.

Accolades
The score by Victor Young was nominated for an Academy Award for Best Original Score.

Adaptations
On January 7, 1940, Stanwyck performed a parody of Golden Boy on The Jack Benny Program.

The 1947 film Body and Soul was partly based on Golden Boy.

Identification of murder suspect
Irving "Gangy" Cohen, one of the alleged hitmen employed by the Murder, Inc. organized crime syndicate, was identified by chief prosecution witness Abraham Levine when Levine attended a screening of Golden Boy and spotted Cohen in one of the ringside crowd scenes. Following the murder of racketeer Walter Sage in 1937 in the Catskills, Cohen had fled to California and obtained bit parts in films.  Cohen was brought to trial and acquitted on June 21, 1940.

References

External links

 
 
 

1939 films
1939 romantic drama films
1930s sports drama films
American black-and-white films
American boxing films
American films based on plays
American romantic drama films
Columbia Pictures films
1930s English-language films
Films about violins and violinists
Films based on works by Clifford Odets
Films directed by Rouben Mamoulian
Films scored by Victor Young
American sports drama films
Films produced by William Perlberg
1930s American films